Outbound is the third album by Norwegian symphonic power metal band Keldian. It was released on October 31, 2013 via Galactic Butterfly Music. Outbound was largely funded by a campaign on IndieGoGo, which raised $6,808 for the project between February 26, 2013 and April 27, 2013. Supporters of the campaign received a limited-edition signed copy of the album.

Music
The album starts with "Burn the Sky". Lyrically, the song is a critique of militarisation of space by such groups as the Project for a New American Century. It specifically refers to its influential report, Rebuilding America's Defenses: Strategies, Forces, and Resources For a New Century, which call to protect resources of rich and influential "haves" from poor and frustrated "have nots".

Track listing

Song information 

 A Place Above the Air
Based on Dan Simmons' Endymion series.

 The Silfen Paths and Morning Light Mountain
Based on Peter F. Hamilton's Commonwealth Saga.

Personnel
Christer Andresen – lead vocals, guitars, bass
Arild Aardalen – synthesizers, vocals

Additional musicians
Jørn Holen – drums
Thommie Myhrvold – vocals 
Helene Hande Midje – vocals 
Kjell Vidar Merkesdal – vocals

References

2013 albums
Keldian albums